South Wenhai Road  is a station on Line 1 and Line 8 of the Hangzhou Metro in China. It was opened on 24 November 2015, together with the expanded section of Line 1. The Line 8 was opened on 28 June 2021. It is located in the Qiantang District of Hangzhou.

References

Railway stations in Zhejiang
Railway stations in China opened in 2015
Hangzhou Metro stations